Youhaiella is a genus of bacteria from the family of Hyphomicrobiaceae with one known species (Youhaiella tibetensis).

References

Hyphomicrobiales
Monotypic bacteria genera
Bacteria genera